John Wylie "Colonel" Rice (February 18, 1881 – February 12, 1941) was an American-Canadian rower who competed in the 1904 Summer Olympics. He was a member of the Argonaut Rowing Club, which won the silver medal in the men's eight. Only two teams, however, competed in the event.

References

External links
William Rice's profile at Sports Reference.com

1881 births
1941 deaths
Olympic rowers of Canada
Rowers at the 1904 Summer Olympics
Olympic silver medalists for Canada
Olympic medalists in rowing
Canadian male rowers
Canadian people of American descent
Medalists at the 1904 Summer Olympics